Saint-Maurice-de-Rémens is a commune in the Ain department in eastern France.

Geography
The village lies on the left bank of the river Albarine, which flows west through the commune. The river Ain forms most of the commune's southwestern border.

Population

See also
Communes of the Ain department

References

Communes of Ain
Ain communes articles needing translation from French Wikipedia